{{Automatic taxobox
| image =
| image_caption = 
| taxon = Pegoscapus
| authority = Cameron, 1906
| type_species = Pegoscapus longiceps| type_species_authority = Cameron, 1906
| subdivision_ranks = Species
| subdivision_ref = 
| subdivision = Pegoscapus aemulus (Grandi)Pegoscapus aerumnosus (Grandi)Pegoscapus aguilari (Grandi)Pegoscapus amabilis (Grandi)Pegoscapus ambiguus (Grandi) (Blanchard, 1944)Pegoscapus assuetus (Grandi)Pegoscapus astomus (Grandi)Pegoscapus attentus (Grandi)Pegoscapus baschierii (Grandi) (Mayr, 1885)Pegoscapus brasiliensis (Mayr)Pegoscapus bruneri (Grandi)Pegoscapus cabrerai (Blanchard)Pegoscapus carlosi (Ramírez, 1970) (Schiffler & Azevedo, 2002)Pegoscapus cumanensis (Ramírez) (Hoffmeyer, 1932)Pegoscapus elisae (Grandi)Pegoscapus estherae (Grandi)Pegoscapus flagellatus (Wiebes)Pegoscapus flaviscapa (Ashmead)Pegoscapus franki (Wiebes)Pegoscapus gemellus (Wiebes)Pegoscapus grandii (Hoffmeyer)Pegoscapus groegeri (Wiebes)Pegoscapus herrei (Wiebes)Pegoscapus hoffmeyeri (Grandi)Pegoscapus ileanae (Ramírez)Pegoscapus insularis (Ashmead)Pegoscapus jimenezi (Grandi)Pegoscapus kraussi (Grandi)Pegoscapus longiceps (Cameron)Pegoscapus lopesi (Mangabeira Filho)Pegoscapus mariae (Ramírez)Pegoscapus mexicanus (Ashmead)Pegoscapus obscurus (Kirby)Pegoscapus orozcoi (Ramírez)Pegoscapus philippi (Grandi)Pegoscapus piceipes (Ashmead)Pegoscapus silvestrii (Grandi)Pegoscapus tomentellae (Wiebes)Pegoscapus tonduzi (Grandi)Pegoscapus torresi (Grandi)Pegoscapus tristani (Grandi)Pegoscapus urbanae (Ramírez)Pegoscapus williamsi (Grandi)
}}Pegoscapus is a genus of fig wasp native to the Americas.  They range from Florida and Mexico in the north to Argentina in the south.  Fig wasps have an obligate mutualism with the fig species they pollinate.  Pegoscapus pollinates species in section Americana of the subgenus Urostigma''.

The genus is estimated to be 28 million years old using cytochrome oxidase nucleotide sequences, and more than 20 million years old based on a fossil in amber from the Dominican Republic.

References 

Agaonidae
Hymenoptera genera
Fauna of the Southeastern United States
Insects of the Caribbean
Insects of Mexico
Insects of Central America
Insects of South America